Le Fresne-sur-Loire (literally Le Fresne on Loire) is a former commune of the Loire-Atlantique department in western France. On 1 January 2016, it was merged into the new commune of Ingrandes-le-Fresne-sur-Loire, and became part of the Maine-et-Loire department. It is around 25 km west of Angers, and around 50 km east of Nantes.

References

Former communes of Loire-Atlantique
Geography of Maine-et-Loire
Populated places disestablished in 2016